John Leonard Pierce (April 25, 1895 – February 12, 1959) was a United States Army officer with the rank of brigadier general. He is most noted as a commander of the 16th Armored Division during World War II.

Early years

John Leonard Pierce was born on April 25, 1895 in Dallas, Texas as the son of lawyer, Frank Cushman Pierce and his wife, Isabella. Pierce attended the West Texas Military Academy in San Antonio, Texas and subsequently Texas A&M University and then joined the Army in June 1917. Subsequently served during World War I in France. After war, Pierce served with 8th Infantry Division within Occupation forces in Koblenz, Germany.

After return to the United States, Pierce stayed in the Army and was interested in mobile warfare and the development of armor.

World War II

At the beginning of World War II, Pierce served as a Deputy Chief of Staff of the 3rd Armored Division under command of Major general Alvan C. Gillem. One year later, Pierce was transferred to the II Armored Corps (later redesignated as the XVIII Airborne Corps), where he served as Chief of Staff.

In June 1943, Pierce was promoted to the rank of brigadier general and was appointed a Chief of Staff of Armored Command. He stayed in this capacity until September 1944, when he was transferred to Camp Chaffee in Arkansas, where he assumed command of 16th Armored Division. He replaced major general Douglass T. Greene in this capacity.

Pierce arrived with his 16th Armored Division in Europe in February 1945 and participated in combats in Germany and Czechoslovakia. Pierce commanded the division during the liberation of Pilsen.

For his service during World War II, general Pierce was awarded with Legion of Merit with Oak Leaf Cluster by the government of the United States and with Order of the White Lion and with War Cross by the government of the Czechoslovakia for his merits during liberation of Western Bohemia.

Life after War

Pierce was subsequently transferred back to the United States, where he was appointed the President of the Secretary of War's Discharge Review Board. He served in this capacity until 1946, when he retired from the Army.

Brigadier general John Leonard Pierce died at the age of 63 at his home in San Antonio, Texas and is buried at Fort Sam Houston National Cemetery together with his wife, Kate Bodine Pierce (1895 - 1988).

Decorations

Here is Brigadier general Pierce´s ribbon bar:

Gallery

See also

References

1895 births
1959 deaths
Military personnel from Dallas
United States Army personnel of World War I
United States Army generals
Texas A&M University alumni
United States Army Command and General Staff College alumni
Burials at Fort Sam Houston National Cemetery
Recipients of the Legion of Merit
Recipients of the Military Order of the White Lion
Recipients of the Czechoslovak War Cross
United States Army generals of World War II
TMI Episcopal alumni